Devon Bridge may refer to:

Bridges in Canada:
 Devon Bridge (Alberta)

Bridges in the United States:
 Washington Bridge (Connecticut), also known as the "Devon Bridge", brings US Route 1 over the Housatonic River at Devon neighborhood of Milford, Connecticut
 Housatonic River Railroad Bridge, also known as the "Devon Bridge", adjacent railroad bridge over the Housatonic River